"Shoulda Woulda Coulda" is a song by English singer Beverley Knight, released as the second single from her third studio album, Who I Am (2002). Written about the breakup of her long-term relationship because she decided to put her career first, the song became Knight's first top-10 single in the United Kingdom, peaking at number 10 on the UK Singles Chart and topping the UK R&B Singles Chart.

Music video

The song's music video was shot in the Hout Bay area of Cape Town, South Africa, and directed by Douglas Avery. The location for the video was of special significance to Knight. She had visited previously in connection with her charity work in bringing awareness to HIV in South Africa. It was also the location of the video to her single "No Man's Land", released in 2007.

Track listings
UK CD1
 "Shoulda Woulda Coulda" 
 "Shoulda Woulda Coulda" (featuring ) 
 "Shoulda Woulda Coulda" 
 "Shoulda Woulda Coulda" 

UK CD2
 "Shoulda Woulda Coulda" 
 "Shoulda Woulda Coulda" 
 "Special Kinda Cool"

UK cassette single
 "Shoulda Woulda Coulda" 
 "Shoulda Woulda Coulda" (featuring ) 
 "Shoulda Woulda Coulda"

Personnel
Personnel are lifted from the UK CD2 liner notes.
 Beverley Knight – writing, vocals
 Craig Wiseman – writing
 Mike Spencer, Tony Briscoe – production
 Mike 'Spike' Drake – additional production, mixing
 Jack Clark – mixing assistant
 YoYo – additional programming

Charts

See also
 Beverley Knight discography

References

2002 singles
2002 songs
Beverley Knight songs
Parlophone singles
Songs written by Craig Wiseman